Mangalanadu  is a village in the  
Aranthangirevenue block of Pudukkottai district, Tamil Nadu, India.

Demographics 

As per the 2001 census, Mangalanadu had a total population of  
1988 with 989 males and 999 females. Out of the total population 
1254 people were literate.

References

Villages in Pudukkottai district